Love Shine Down may refer to:

 "Love Shine Down", a 2010 song by Olly Murs, (featuring Jessie J) from Olly Murs
 "Love Shine Down", a 2015 song by Dusty Springfield from Faithful
 "Love Shine Down", a 2016 song by Shaun Escoffery from Evergreen
 "Love Shine Down", a 2021 song by Eric Church from Heart & Soul